Douglas Rae may refer to:

 Douglas Rae (TV executive) (born 1947), Scottish television producer and executive
 Douglas Rae (businessman) (1931–2018), Scottish businessman
 Douglas W. Rae (born 1939), professor of management and political science at Yale University

See also
 Doug Rea (born 1949)